Political divisions of Korea may refer to:

Administrative divisions of North Korea
Administrative divisions of South Korea
Provinces of Korea - historical information
Special cities of North Korea
Special cities of South Korea